Jenő Kiss(born February 10, 1972 in Budapest, Hungary), is an International Federation of BodyBuilding & Fitness (IFBB) professional bodybuilder. He works as a personal trainer.

In 1996 he won the World Amateur Bodybuilding Championships (formerly IFBB Mr. Universe).

Kiss has been featured in many fitness and bodybuilding articles. He currently resides in Budapest, Hungary.

 Amateur bodybuilding titles

 Professional bodybuilding titles

References

1972 births
Hungarian bodybuilders
Living people